Bald Eagle Lake is a lake in Anoka, Ramsey, and Washington counties in the U.S. state of Minnesota.

Bald Eagle Lake was named from the fact bald eagles nested on the lake island.
Bald Eagle Lake is known for its muskellunge population and is stocked with walleye and muskellunge.

See also
List of lakes in Minnesota

References

Lakes of Minnesota
Lakes of Anoka County, Minnesota
Lakes of Ramsey County, Minnesota
Lakes of Washington County, Minnesota